The Benelli M2 is a semi-automatic shotgun manufactured by Benelli Armi SpA, and one of the "Benelli Super 90" series of semi-auto shotguns. It is an updated version of the Benelli M1. Like its predecessor, it is available in several versions for civilian, law enforcement and military use.   It features the proprietary Benelli inertia system of operation.

Operation
The inertia recoil system was developed for the Benelli M1, M2, and M3 shotguns in the early 1980s. This short-stroke recoil system is dependent upon the force of the shotgun's rearward movement under recoil. As a result of inertia, heavier loads cycle in a shorter amount of time.

The recoil spring is housed within the butt stock in the same manner as a Browning Auto-5 or Remington 1100; as  a result, the shotgun can only cycle with a butt stock in place.

Users
The M2 Super 90 is marketed as a tactical or defensive shotgun to military and police forces as well as to civilian hunters and target shooters for skeet, sporting clays and trap shooting.

Exhibition sharpshooter Tom Knapp used a Benelli M2 in many of his shooting demonstrations, breaking 10 clays in 2.2 seconds with the M2 and an extended magazine.

A popular sporting variant of the Benelli M2 is the XRAIL design offered by Roth Concept Innovations.  This modified magazine tube gives the shooter a 25-round magazine capacity by using 4 tubes in tandem like a revolver's cylinder.

See also
 Benelli M3
 Benelli M4

References

External links
 Benelli M2 Owners Manual

Benelli Armi SpA
Semi-automatic shotguns of Italy